The Damansara Idaman LRT station is a light rapid transit (LRT) station that serve the suburb of Petaling Jaya in Selangor, Malaysia. It serves as one of the stations on the Shah Alam line. The station will be built near Shell and Petronas Layby of the New Klang Valley Expressway.

The station is marked as Station No. 5 along with the RM9 billion line project with the line's maintenance depot located in Johan Setia, Klang. The Damansara Idaman LRT station is expected to be operational in February 2024 and will have facilities such as Park and Ride, kiosks, restrooms, elevators, taxi stand and feeder bus among others.

Surrounding Areas
Damansara Idaman
Damansara Legenda
PJU1 / PJU1A
Taman Bukit Mayang Emas
Dataran Prima
Aman Suria
Maisson Residence
Arrows International Secondary School
Taipan Ara Damansara
Prima Avenue
Mutiara Oriental Condominium

References

External links
 LRT3 Bandar Utama-Klang Line

Rapid transit stations in Selangor
Shah Alam Line